Teal Harle  (born 5 October 1996 in Campbell River) is a Canadian freestyle skier who competes internationally.
 
He represented Canada in slopestyle at the 2018 Winter Olympics in PyeongChang, where he qualified for the final, along with two fellow Canadian skiers, and finished fifth.

On January 24, 2022, Harle was named to Canada's 2022 Olympic team.

References

External links 
 
 

1996 births
Living people
Canadian male freestyle skiers
Olympic freestyle skiers of Canada
Freestyle skiers at the 2018 Winter Olympics
Freestyle skiers at the 2022 Winter Olympics
People from Campbell River, British Columbia
Sportspeople from British Columbia
X Games athletes